Evelyn Oddeth Morataya Marroquín (born 22 August 1972) is a Guatemalan politician, activist, and the former First Lady of Guatemala from 2000 until 2004. She was the second wife of the President of Guatemala, Alfonso Portillo Cabrera. She became First Lady when she was 28 years old, being one of the youngest First Ladies in the history of Guatemala.

Morataya accompanied her husband to many state visits, highlighting the visit that Portillo and Morataya made to the Emperors of Japan in 2003, and the 11th Ibero-American Summit held in 2001.

After the government of Alfonso Portillo, and accusations of corruption that were made against him, Morataya and Portillo divorced. Upon the return of Portillo in 2015 to Guatemala after serving a sentence in the United States, Morataya announced that she would seek to be a candidate for deputy for Todos, a few days she declined the candidacy.

References

 

Living people
1972 births
First ladies of Guatemala
Members of the Congress of Guatemala